The Heartland Collegiate Athletic Conference (HCAC) is an intercollegiate athletic conference affiliated with the NCAA's Division III. Member institutions are located in Indiana, Kentucky and Ohio. Founded as the Indiana Collegiate Athletic Conference (ICAC) in 1987, it reincorporated under its current name in 1998 with the addition of several schools from Ohio.

Original members of the HCAC included Anderson, Bluffton, Franklin, Hanover, Manchester, Mount St. Joseph, Wabash, and Wilmington. Of the ten current members, six were founding members of the former ICAC.

Former members include DePauw (1987-1998), Taylor (1988-1991), Wabash (1987-1999), and Wilmington (1998-2000). Rose–Hulman Institute of Technology (1988-1998) re-joined as of July 1, 2006.

History
The Indiana Collegiate Athletic Conference (ICAC) was formed in June 1987, with 1990–91 being the first full season of competition (all eight teams competing in eight varsity sports).

Charter members in 1987 included Anderson University, DePauw University, Franklin College, Hanover College, Manchester College, and Wabash College. Rose-Hulman Institute of Technology and Taylor University later joined in 1988. Taylor left the conference after the 1990–91 season.

The addition of three Ohio schools (Bluffton College, the College of Mount St. Joseph, and Wilmington College) and the departure of two Indiana schools (DePauw and Rose-Hulman) during the 1998–99 season prompted a change in name to Heartland Collegiate Athletic Conference. Wabash and Wilmington later departed in the 1998–99 and 1999–2000 seasons respectively. Defiance College and Transylvania University joined in 2000 and 2001 respectively. Rose-Hulman re-joined the HCAC, effective for the 2006–07 season.

The most recent expansion was when Earlham College of Richmond, Indiana was accepted as the 10th member of the conference in October 2009 to begin competition in the fall of 2010.

Chronological timeline

 1987 - On June 1987, the HCAC was founded as the Indiana Collegiate Athletic Conference (ICAC). Charter members included Anderson College (now Anderson University), DePauw University, Franklin College, Hanover College, Manchester College, and Wabash College, effective beginning the 1987-88 academic year.
 1988 - Rose–Hulman Institute of Technology and Taylor University joined the ICAC, effective in the 1988-89 academic year.
 1990 - The ICAC began their first full season on competition, competing in eight varsity sports, effective in the 1990-91 academic year.
 1991 - Taylor left the ICAC, effective after the 1990-91 academic year.
 1998 - DePauw and Rose–Hulman (or Rose–Hulman Tech or RHIT) left the ICAC to join the Southern Collegiate Athletic Conference (SCAC), effective after the 1997-98 academic year.
 1998 - Bluffton College (now Bluffton University), the College of Mount St. Joseph (now Mount St. Joseph University) and Wilmington College joined the ICAC, effective in the 1998-99 academic year.
 1998 - The ICAC has rebranded as the Heartland Collegiate Athletic Conference (HCAC), effective in the 1998-99 academic year.
 1999 - Wabash left the HCAC to join the North Coast Athletic Conference (NCAC), effective after the 1998-99 academic year. Its football program later left effective after the 1999 fall season (1999-2000 academic year).
 2000 - Wilmington left the HCAC to join the Ohio Athletic Conference (OAC), effective after the 1999-2000 academic year.
 2000 - Defiance College joined the HCAC, effective in the in 2000-01 academic year.
 2001 - Transylvania University joined the HCAC, effective in the in 2001-02 academic year.
 2006 - Rose–Hulman re-joined back to the HCAC, effective in the 2006-07 academic year.
 2010 - Earlham College joined the HCAC, effective in the 2010-11 academic year.

Member schools

Current members
The HCAC currently has ten full members, all private schools:

Notes

Former members
The HCAC has four former full members, all were private schools:

Notes

Membership timeline

Sports

Member teams compete in women's basketball, cross country, golf, soccer, softball, tennis, track and field and volleyball and men's baseball, basketball, cross country, football, golf, soccer, tennis and track and field.

References

External links
 

 
Sports in Indianapolis
Organizations based in Indianapolis